Kristjánsson is a surname of Icelandic origin, meaning son of Kristján. In Icelandic names, the name is not strictly a surname, but a patronymic. The name refers to:

Albert Kristjansson (1877–1974), Canadian politician from Manitoba; provincial legislator 1920–1922
Benedikt Kristjánsson (born 1987), Icelandic tenor
Broddi Kristjansson (born 1960), Icelandic Olympic badminton player
Guðjón Arnar Kristjánsson (born 1944), Icelandic politician; member of the Alþing since 1999
Jón Kristjánsson (1920–1996), Icelandic Olympic cross-country skier
Jónas Kristjánsson (1924–2014), Icelandic scholar and novelist
Matthías Kristjánsson (1924–1998), Icelandic Olympic cross-country skier
Sigurður Kári Kristjánsson (born 1973), Icelandic politician; member of the Alþing since 2003
Snorri Hergill Kristjánsson (born 1974), Icelandic author
Stefán Kristjánsson (1982–2018), Icelandic chess grandmaster

Icelandic-language surnames
Patronymic surnames